Somy Boys is a 2002 Sri Lankan Sinhala comedy family film directed by A. A. Junaideen and co-produced by N. Udaya Kumar, V. Anthony Raja, P. Arooran and J. S. Ravi Fernando for Super Hits Films Private Limited. It stars comic duo Bandu Samarasinghe, and Tennyson Cooray in lead roles along with Sanath Gunathilake, Rex Kodippili and Rajitha Hiran. Music for the film was by Somapala Rathnayake. The film became one of Sri Lanka's blockbuster movies with reaching more than 150 days in cinema theaters. It is the 995th Sri Lankan film in the Sinhala cinema.

Plot
Rex, Bandusena and Sanath are businessmen living in hill country of Sri Lanka. Quarreling over money Rex accidentally kills Bandusena and he pretends Sanath did the murder. But Sanath's servant, Dadin Bidin sees the actual scene. Rex keeps asking for ransom from Bandusena telling he will reveal the murder.

Meanwhile, Bin (Tennison Kooray) and Bush (Bandu Samarasinghe) are youngsters who have left their homes to find jobs. They become friends with Sanath's servant (Rajitha Hiran) on their way and they run into many hilarious incidents.

Later truth about the murder is revealed and Sanath marries Bin's sister. Bush reveals that he is the son of the Bandusena. As Dadin Bidin complains the police about the actual murder, Police takes Rex.

Finally Bin and Bush marry alongside Sanath at his wedding.

Cast
 Bandu Samarasinghe as Bush / Bandusena Mudalali 
 Tennyson Cooray as Bean
 Sanath Gunathilake as Sanath
 Rex Kodippili as Rex 
 Rajitha Hiran as Dadin Bidin
 Sunil Hettiarachchi as WWW Sugathapala, Bean's father
 Berty Gunathilake as Punyadasa
 Janesh Silva as Banda 
 Sando Harris as Doctor Chicago
 Damitha Saluwadana as Bean's mother
 M. V. Balan as Factory manager
 Chathura Perera as Pinto
 Premadasa Vithanage as 100 year seeker
 Teddy Vidyalankara as Teddy
 Tyrone Michael as Michael
 Sunil Bamunuarachchi as Wedding fighter
 Raju Gamage as Wedding fighter

Songs

References

2002 films
2000s Sinhala-language films